Jeffery Adam Everett (born February 5, 1977), is an American former professional baseball shortstop and third baseman.  He played college baseball for both the NC State Wolfpack and South Carolina Gamecocks.  He was drafted in the first round of the 1998 Major League Baseball Draft and established himself for his defensive prowess as the starting shortstop for the Houston Astros in 2003.  Everett continued his involvement in baseball as a roving infield instructor for the Houston Astros minor league system, and was named bench coach for the Astros on September 1, 2014.

Professional career

Minor leagues
In 1995 the Chicago Cubs drafted Everett in the fourth round out of Harrison High School. He did not sign with the team and in 1998 he was selected by the Boston Red Sox with the 12th pick of the Major League draft.

During the 1998 and 1999 seasons, Everett played for A Lowell and AA Trenton before he was traded to the Houston Astros for outfielder Carl Everett during the 2000 season.

In 2000, he played 126 games at AAA New Orleans, where he batted .245. Taking a break from minor league baseball he traveled to Sydney for the 2000 Summer Olympics, where he helped the US team capture the gold medal.

Houston Astros
Everett made his Major League debut on August 30, 2001, and scored his first run against the San Francisco Giants on September 18 to tie the game at 2–2 in the ninth inning. He appeared in nine games for the Astros that season and played 114 in New Orleans.

In 2002, he appeared in 40 games for the Astros and played 88 in New Orleans. He was called up again in 2003 and played 128 games for the Astros. During that span he hit .256 with eight home runs. On August 6 Everett hit the first ever inside-the-park home run at Minute Maid Park versus the New York Mets. On July 9 he hit his first career grand slam against the Cincinnati Reds.

Everett finished second in the 2004 National League All-Star balloting for shortstops behind the St. Louis Cardinals' Édgar Rentería.

In 2005, Everett hit a career-high 11 home runs and reached the World Series, where he went 1-for-15 as the Astros were swept in four games by the Chicago White Sox.

He was honored with a Fielding Bible Award as the best fielding MLB shortstop in 2006.  According to Baseball-Reference.com, Everett posted a defensive wins above replacement of 4.0, the highest recorded mark in major league history.  He also led the majors in total zone runs with 40, the highest for any position in baseball since 1952.  However, Omar Vizquel won the Gold Glove at shortstop for 2006, based on voting from coaches and managers.

In 2007, Everett became the all-time shortstop home run leader for the Houston Astros with 34.

On June 14, 2007, Everett was involved in a collision with left fielder Carlos Lee while chasing down a fly ball. Everett was diagnosed with a fractured fibula. He missed three months, returning for just the last three games of the 2007 season.

Minnesota Twins
On December 13, 2007, he was not offered a contract renewal by the Astros, who had recently traded for shortstop Miguel Tejada. He signed with the Minnesota Twins later the same day, where he played one season.

Detroit Tigers
On December 15, 2008, Everett signed a one-year deal with the Detroit Tigers worth $1 million plus incentives. On December 7, 2009, Everett signed another one-year deal with Detroit, worth $1.55 million.

On June 6, 2010, the Detroit Tigers designated Everett for assignment, replacing him with rookie shortstop Danny Worth. Everett was released by the Tigers on June 15.

Cleveland Indians
On December 16, 2010, Everett signed a minor league contract with the Indians with an invitation to 2011 major league spring training. He earned a place on the Indians' roster. He was designated for assignment on June 27 and released on June 30.

Retirement
Everett retired on January 13, 2012, and was hired by the Indians front office to be a special assistant to baseball operations.
In 2014 Everett returned to the Houston Astros as a roving infield instructor for the minor league system. On September 1, 2014, Everett was named the bench coach for the major league team.

References

External links

, or Retrosheet, or Pura Pelota (VPBL)
Everett is Mr. Smooth in the field – Meet the best defensive shortstop in baseball Jerry Crasnick ESPN.com

1977 births
Living people
Baseball players at the 2000 Summer Olympics
Baseball players from Georgia (U.S. state)
Cleveland Indians players
Detroit Tigers players
Fort Myers Miracle players
Gulf Coast Twins players
Houston Astros coaches
Houston Astros players
Leones del Caracas players
American expatriate baseball players in Venezuela
Lowell Spinners players
Major League Baseball shortstops
Minnesota Twins players
New Orleans Zephyrs players
Olympic gold medalists for the United States in baseball
People from Austell, Georgia
Rochester Red Wings players
South Carolina Gamecocks baseball players
Sportspeople from Cobb County, Georgia
Trenton Thunder players
Medalists at the 2000 Summer Olympics